GWR 4073 Class 5029 Nunney Castle is a Great Western Railway Castle Class steam locomotive. It was built at the GWR's Swindon Works in 1934, being outshopped on 28 May and taking the name of Nunney Castle near Frome, Somerset. The locomotive was used in many publicity and "life on the railway" type of photographs. During the first day of the evacuation of civilians during World War II, the locomotive hauled trains carrying children being taken from London to the safety of the countryside. Nunney Castle was also used to haul the Royal Train in October 1957 from London Paddington station to Gloucester.

Allocation
No. 5029 was initially allocated to Old Oak Common MPD (code PDN/81A) in West London where it was to spend most of its working life. The engine moved to Worcester in 1958, then had spells at Newton Abbot and Laira before a final transfer in December 1962 took it to Cardiff East Dock, where it was to remain until being withdrawn along with other members of its class in December 1963.

Sale and restoration
Nunney Castle was sold in 1964 to Woodham Brothers at Barry, Vale of Glamorgan, arriving at the famous scrap yard in June where it was to languish for 12 years. Sold to a consortium consisting of private individuals (50%) and the Great Western Society at Didcot Railway Centre (50%), it was rescued from Woodham's in May 1976, and was the last loco to leave Barry scrapyard by rail. The loco returned to the main line in 1990. In the mid 1990s, the private consortium took total control and the loco left Didcot for a life on the main line. After sale to Jeremy Hosking and a further overhaul, the locomotive returned to the main line in April 2008. As of 2020 it awaited overhaul at Crewe.

References

External links

 5029 Nunney Castle - Icons Of Steam Official Webpage

5029
Railway locomotives introduced in 1934
5029
Locomotives saved from Woodham Brothers scrapyard
Articles containing video clips
Standard gauge steam locomotives of Great Britain